Admiral Sir Richard Wells  (3 February 1833 – 9 October 1896) was a Royal Navy officer who went on to be Commander-in-Chief, The Nore.

Naval career
Wells joined the Royal Navy in 1847 and served in the Crimean War in 1855. He was on board HMS Bombay when she was accidentally burned in 1864 with the loss of 91 lives off Montevideo. Promoted to Captain in 1866, he commanded HMS Revenge, HMS Royal Alfred, HMS Bellerophon and then HMS  Agincourt. He became Captain of the training ship HMS Britannia in 1880 before being appointed Commander-in-Chief, Cape of Good Hope and West Coast of Africa Station in 1888 and Commander-in-Chief, The Nore in 1894.

References

|-

1833 births
1896 deaths
Royal Navy admirals
Knights Commander of the Order of the Bath